The year 2008 is the 14th year in the history of Fighting Network Rings, a mixed martial arts promotion based in Japan. In 2008 Fighting Network Rings held 4 events beginning with, Rings: The Outsider.

Events list

Rings: The Outsider

Rings: The Outsider was an event held on March 30, 2008, at Differ Ariake Arena in Tokyo, Japan.

Results

Rings: The Outsider 2

Rings: The Outsider 2 was an event held on July 19, 2008, at Differ Ariake Arena in Tokyo, Japan.

Results

Rings: The Outsider 3

Rings: The Outsider 3 was an event held on October 19, 2008, at Differ Ariake Arena in Tokyo, Japan.

Results

Rings: The Outsider 4

Rings: The Outsider 4 was an event held on December 20, 2008, at Differ Ariake Arena in Tokyo, Japan.

Results

See also 
 Fighting Network Rings
 List of Fighting Network Rings events

References

Fighting Network Rings events
2008 in mixed martial arts